Stanisława Perzanowska (born July 2, 1898 in Warsaw - May 24, 1982 in Warsaw) was a Polish actress, theater and film director, professor at the National Higher School of Theatre in Warsaw.

She graduated from the Warsaw Dramatic School in 1919. Immediately she started working for the Warsaw-based Teatr Reduta. She also collaborated with the Ateneum Theatre in Warsaw, Polish Theater in Vilnius, Silesian Theatre in Katowice, National Theatre and Teatr Współczesny in Warsaw.

Stanisława Perzanowska  starred in several films, both before and after World War II.
She was also well known for his role  as Helena Matysiak in  the popular radio drama The Matysiaks .

Selected filmography
Actress
 1933: Romeo i Julcia 
 1934: Córka generała Pankratowa 
 1954: Niedaleko Warszawy 
Director
 1936: Jego wielka miłość  (directed by Stanisława Perzanowska and Mieczysław Krawicz)

References

External links
 
Stanisława Perzanowska at Culture.pl 
Stanisława Perzanowska  at the Encyklopedia WIEM 

1898 births
1982 deaths
Actresses from Warsaw
Polish stage actresses
Polish film actresses
Polish actresses
Polish film directors
Polish women film directors